The 2002 Liège–Bastogne–Liège was the 88th edition of the Liège–Bastogne–Liège cycle race and was held on 21 April 2002. The race started in Liège and finished in Ans. The race was won by Paolo Bettini of the Mapei team.

General classification

References

2002
2002 in Belgian sport
Liege-Bastogne-Liege
2002 in road cycling
April 2002 sports events in Europe